Jan Šebek (born 31 March 1991) is a Czech football player. He is a goalkeeper who is currently a free agent. He has played for the national youth teams of the Czech Republic.

Career

Chelsea
Jan Šebek joined Chelsea in 2009, joining up with countryman Petr Čech and signing a two-year professional contract. He had previously had 2 trials; one in 2007 and the other in 2009. Carlo Ancelotti was convinced of his talents after he kept a clean sheet against the Arsenal Reserves on trial in 2009. At the ended of the 2009/2010 season, he ended up in goal for the reserves with Rhys Taylor injured but he made just two appearances. At the age of 20, Šebek left Chelsea and returned to the Czech Republic, signing a three-year deal with FK Baumit Jablonec.

References

External links
 
 

1991 births
Living people
Czech footballers
Association football goalkeepers
Czech Republic youth international footballers
Chelsea F.C. players
FK Bohemians Prague (Střížkov) players
FK Jablonec players
Dukla Prague footballers
People from Planá
Sportspeople from the Plzeň Region